Fred Hamilton (born 1936) is a professional American bridge player. Hamilton is a World Bridge Federation (WBF) World Grand Master and American Contract Bridge League (ACBL) Grand Life Master and inventor of the popular Hamilton convention used to compete over the opponent's 1NT opening bid.

Born and raised in East Lansing, Michigan, he is more recently from Encino, California. Hamilton has won two world championships, the 1976 Bermuda Bowl as a member of the North America team – beating Italy, with three Blue Team players, in the final – and the 1994 World Senior Pairs Championship with Hamish Bennett. He names Billy Eisenberg, Mark Lair, Mike Passell and Paul Soloway as "my favorite partners and good friends".
 
Hamilton was inducted into the ACBL Hall of Fame in 2003.

Bridge accomplishments

Honors

 ACBL Hall of Fame, 2003

Awards

 Herman Trophy (1) 1974

Wins

 Bermuda Bowl (1) 1976 
 World Senior Pairs Championship (1) 1994
 Cavendish Invitational Pairs (1) 1982 
 North American Bridge Championships (17)
 Lebhar IMP Pairs (1) 1989 
 Leventritt Silver Ribbon Pairs (2) 2001, 2012 
 Grand National Teams (1) 1998 
 Truscott Senior Swiss Teams (4) 1998, 2003, 2008, 2013 
 Vanderbilt (1) 1977 
 Senior Knockout Teams (2) 1996, 1998 
 Chicago Mixed Board-a-Match (1) 1976 
 Reisinger (4) 1974, 1975, 1978, 1979 
 Spingold (1) 1979

Runners-up

 Bermuda Bowl (1) 1977 
 World Senior Teams Championship (1) 1994
 World Olympiad Teams Championship (1) 1980
 North American Bridge Championships (16)
 Leventritt Silver Ribbon Pairs (1) 1992 
 Rockwell Mixed Pairs (1) 2000 
 Wernher Open Pairs (1) 1986 
 Grand National Teams (1) 1974 
 Jacoby Open Swiss Teams (1) 1988 
 Truscott Senior Swiss Teams (2) 2004, 2005 
 Vanderbilt (3) 1972, 1981, 1983 
 Senior Knockout Teams (2) 2006, 2009 
 Keohane North American Swiss Teams (2) 1991, 1992 
 Mitchell Board-a-Match Teams (1) 1980 
 Chicago Mixed Board-a-Match (1) 1967

References

External links
  – with video interview
 

1936 births
American contract bridge players
Bermuda Bowl players
People from Los Angeles
Living people
Date of birth missing (living people)
Place of birth missing (living people)